Brubeck and Rushing is a 1960 album by The Dave Brubeck Quartet and the singer Jimmy Rushing.

Reception 

The initial Billboard magazine review from 31 December 1960 commented that "This is surely a most intriguing jazz package. ...It's a swinging affair, with spontaneity and zest, and Brubeck is to be commended for being able to provide such a proper showcase for the vocalist"

The album was reviewed by Scott Yanow at Allmusic who wrote that "On ten standards Brubeck, altoist Paul Desmond and the Quartet fit in perfectly behind the great swing/blues singer Jimmy Rushing who sounds rejuvenated by the fresh setting. This disc, a surprising success, is well worth searching for."

Track listing 
 "There'll Be Some Changes Made" (William Blackstone, W. Benton Overstreet) – 2:10
 "My Melancholy Baby" (Ernie Burnett, George A. Norton) – 4:01
 "Blues in the Dark" (Count Basie, Jimmy Rushing) – 4:42
 "I Never Knew (I Could Love Anyone Like I'm Loving You)" (Raymond B. Egan, Roy Marsh, Tom Pitts) – 2:32
 "Ain't Misbehavin'" (Harry Brooks, Andy Razaf, Fats Waller) – 3:25
 "Evenin'" (Mitchell Parish, Harry White) – 4:14
 "All by Myself" (Irving Berlin) – 2:34
 "River, Stay 'Way from My Door" (Mort Dixon, Harry Woods) – 4:26
 "You Can Depend on Me" (Charles Carpenter, Louis Dunlap, Earl Hines) – 3:33
 "Am I Blue?" (Harry Akst, Grant Clarke) – 2:54
 "Shine On, Harvest Moon" (Nora Bayes, Jack Norworth) – 2:10

Personnel 
Jimmy Rushing – vocals
Dave Brubeck – piano
Paul Desmond – alto saxophone
Gene Wright – double bass
Joe Morello – drums
Teo Macero – producer

References 

1960 albums
Albums produced by Teo Macero
Columbia Records albums
Dave Brubeck albums
Jimmy Rushing albums